Gypsonoma is a genus of moths belonging to the subfamily Olethreutinae of the family Tortricidae.

Species

Gypsonoma aceriana (Duponchel, in Godart, 1842)
Gypsonoma adjuncta Heinrich, 1924
Gypsonoma aechnemorpha Diakonoff, 1982
Gypsonoma amseli Razowski, 1967
Gypsonoma anthracitis Meyrick, 1912
Gypsonoma attrita Falkovitsh, 1965
Gypsonoma bifasciata Kuznetzov, 1966
Gypsonoma buettikeri Razowski, 1995
Gypsonoma contorta Kuznetzov, 1966
Gypsonoma dealbana (Frolich, 1828)
Gypsonoma distincta Kuznetzov, 1971
Gypsonoma ephoropa (Meyrick, 1931)
Gypsonoma erubesca Kawabe, 1978
Gypsonoma euphraticana (Amsel, 1935)
Gypsonoma fasciolana (Clemens, 1864)
Gypsonoma gymnesiarum Rebel, 1934
Gypsonoma haimbachiana (Kearfott, 1907)
Gypsonoma hiranoi Kawabe, 1980
Gypsonoma holocrypta (Meyrick, 1931)
Gypsonoma infuscana Kuznetzov, 1988
Gypsonoma kawabei Nasu & Kusunoli, 1998
Gypsonoma maritima Kuznetzov, 1970
Gypsonoma mica Kuznetzov, 1966
Gypsonoma minutana (Hubner, [1796-1799])
Gypsonoma monotonica Kuznetzov, in Kuznetzov & Mikkola, 1991
Gypsonoma mutabilana Kuznetzov, 1985
Gypsonoma nebulosana Packard, 1866
Gypsonoma nitidulana (Lienig & Zeller, 1846)
Gypsonoma obraztsovi Amsel, 1959
Gypsonoma ochrotona Razowski, 1963
Gypsonoma oppressana (Treitschke, 1835)
Gypsonoma opsonoma (Meyrick, 1918)
Gypsonoma parryana (Curtis, in Ross, 1835)
Gypsonoma penthetria Diakonoff, 1992
Gypsonoma phaeocremna (Meyrick in Caradja & Meyrick, 1937)
Gypsonoma riparia Meyrick, 1933
Gypsonoma rivulana Oku, 2005
Gypsonoma rubescens Kuznetzov, 1971
Gypsonoma salicicolana (Clemens, 1864)
Gypsonoma simulantana (Staudinger, 1880)
Gypsonoma sociana (Haworth, [1811])
Gypsonoma solidata (Meyrick, 1912)
Gypsonoma substitutionis Heinrich, 1923

See also
 List of Tortricidae genera

References

External links
 
 
 tortricidae.com

Eucosmini
Tortricidae genera
Taxa named by Edward Meyrick